Kasturi Shankar is an Indian singer who sings mainly in Kannada language. She has recorded few films songs in Malayalam and Tulu languages and many non-film songs in Konkani, Tamil, Sanskrit, Telugu and Hindi.

Shankar has sung different kind of songs like film, devotional, Bhaavageethe, classical and folk songs.
In her 30 years singing career, Kasturi has worked with a variety of music composers, including T. G. Lingappa, M. Ranga Rao, Vijaya Bhaskar, Rajan–Nagendra, Gunasingh, G. K. Venkatesh and others. She has sung many duets with Dr. Rajkumar, Vani Jairam, Dr. P.B. Srinivas, T. M. Soundararajan, Vishnuvardhan, KJY and with SPB.
Kasturi Shankar's popular film songs like Sooryana kanthige (for Padmapriya), Sri tulasi daye thoramma (for Jayanthi), Rangena halliyage (for Aarathi), Sri rama bandavne, Raamanu baralilla made her name popular among listeners.

Early life
Kasturi Shankar was born in Mysuru on 1 November 1950 to Girijamma and J. C. Shankarappa. her father was a freedom fighter. She studied SSLC and trained classical music for few years. When Kanagal Prabhakar Shastry spotted Kasturi Shankar's talent, gave her a chance to sing in his film, called Bettada gowri. Then she went on to work with many super hit movies of Puttanna Kanagal, KSL Swamy, B. S. Ranga and with many others. Kasturi married to Shankar and they have two children. Now they are residing in Bangalore.

Notable songs
some of her songs are
 "gudi serada mudiyerada" (Bhagyajyothi)
 "sooryana kanthige" (Thaayige takka maga)
 "rangena halliyage" (Bilee hendthi)
 "raamanu baralilla" (Mithileya seetheyaru)
 "sri rama bandavne" (Paduvaralli panavaru)
 "sri tulasi daye thoramma" (Tulasi)

Awards

Kasturi Shankar has received many awards for her contribution to music. Few are
 Rajyotsava award by Karnataka government 
 Atthimabbe award
 Kempegowda Award by BBMP
 Vachana sahitya sree award by Basava sahitya vedike

References

Kannada playback singers
Singers from Mysore
1950 births
Living people